Cynthia Taft Morris (1928-2013) was an American development economist. She was a graduate from Vassar College, 
London School of Economics and Yale. And she worked on the Marshall Plan, at the World Bank and most notably with Irma Adelman. Cynthia Taft Morris was a granddaughter of former President William Howard Taft.

Selected publications

References

External links

1928 births
2013 deaths
American development economists
American women economists
Vassar College alumni
Alumni of the London School of Economics
Yale University alumni
American expatriates in the United Kingdom
21st-century American women writers